Mehmet Yagci (born  in Sydney) is an Australian male weightlifter, competing in the 54 kg category and representing Australia at international competitions. He participated at the 2000 Summer Olympics in the 56 kg event. He competed at world championships, most recently at the 1997 World Weightlifting Championships.

Major results

References

External links
 

1972 births
Living people
Australian male weightlifters
Weightlifters at the 2000 Summer Olympics
Olympic weightlifters of Australia
Sportspeople from Sydney
Commonwealth Games gold medallists for Australia
Commonwealth Games medallists in weightlifting
Australian people of Turkish descent
Weightlifters at the 1998 Commonwealth Games
Sportsmen from New South Wales
20th-century Australian people
21st-century Australian people
Medallists at the 1998 Commonwealth Games